Reginald Kenneth Braddick (4 August 1913 – December 1999) was a Welsh racing cyclist from Cardiff, Wales. He represented Wales at the 1938 British Empire Games in Sydney, Australia. He won the 1944 NCU national road championship.

His interest in cycling started as a butcher's delivery boy in Cardiff. He opened Reg Braddick Cycles on Broadway, Roath, Cardiff, in 1945 and had the idea of starting Cardiff Ajax Cycling Club in the flat above the shop. Riders who started with the club include Sally Hodge and Nicole Cooke. The shop was run by his son David, daughter-in-law, Janet and granddaughter, Suzy.

Palmarès

1944
1st  British National Road Race Championships – NCU

References

1913 births
1999 deaths
Welsh male cyclists
Commonwealth Games competitors for Wales
Cyclists at the 1938 British Empire Games
British cycling road race champions
Sportspeople from Cardiff